This article is a list of wars and battles involving Malta.

Medieval period (before 1530)

Order of Saint John (1530-1798)

French occupation (1798-1800)

British protectorate and colony (1800-1964)

Republic of Malta (1964-present)

See also
History of Malta

Malta
Wars